Mohamed Ashour Khouaja (born 1 November 1987) is a Libyan sprinter, specialising in the 400 metres.

He finished seventh in his semi-final heat of the men's 400 metres at the 2009 World Championships, his first World Championship. He won the gold medal in the 2009 Mediterranean Games 400 metres final, and is the current Libyan national record holder over 400 metres; he set the record when he won gold in the 2010 African Championships in Nairobi.

International competitions

1Representing Africa

2Did not start in the semifinals

Personal bests
200 metres - 20.91 sec (2009) - national record.
400 metres - 44.98 sec (2010) - national record.

External links

1987 births
Living people
Libyan male sprinters
World Athletics Championships athletes for Libya
Athletes (track and field) at the 2015 African Games
Mediterranean Games gold medalists for Libya
Athletes (track and field) at the 2009 Mediterranean Games
Mediterranean Games medalists in athletics
African Games competitors for Libya